Thryptomene nitida is a species of flowering plant in the family Myrtaceae and is endemic to a small area in the south-west of Western Australia. It is a spreading shrub with upward-pointing, egg-shaped leaves with the narrower end towards the base, and flowers with five pale purple or pinkish petals and ten stamens.

Description
Flowering occurs from June to September.

Taxonomy
Thryptomene nitida was first formally described in 2014 by Barbara Lynette Rye and Malcolm Eric Trudgen in the journal Nuytsia from specimens they collected near Three Springs in 2003. The specific epithet (nitida) means "shining", referring to the surface of the floral cup of the fruit.

Distribution and habitat
This thryptomene grows near creeks and minor drainage lines from the Irwin River and Mingenew to Arrino in the Avon Wheatbelt and Geraldton Sandplains biogeographic regions of south-western Western Australia.

Conservation status
Thryptomene nitida is classified as "Priority Three" by the Government of Western Australia Department of Parks and Wildlife meaning that it is poorly known and known from only a few locations but is not under imminent threat.

References

nitida
Endemic flora of Western Australia
Rosids of Western Australia
Vulnerable flora of Australia
Plants described in 2014
Taxa named by Barbara Lynette Rye
Taxa named by Malcolm Eric Trudgen